Bhopalgarh tehsil is a tehsil in Jodhpur District of Rajasthan state in western India. Headquarters for the tehsil is the town of Bhopalgarh. Bhopalgarh tehsil is an eastern tehsil among the 13 tehsils in Jodhpur District. It borders Nagaur District to the north and east, Pipar city tehsil to the south, Jodhpur tehsil to the southwest, and Bawadi tehsil to the west. Bhopalgarh panchayat samiti has 35 gram panchayats & 116 villages. The mineral and the stone used for Emery Stone are found in Bhopalgarh. Rabi crops are mainly cultivated in the Bhopalgarh Tehsil with Bajra, Moong, Moth, Sesamum (Til), Jowar and Cotton being the most common crops. Bhopalgarh tehsil has a total area of 174623.74 hectares with total cultivable area of 63.92% of total area & 21.27% of total cultivable area as irrigated area as per land use 2011.
Jats are the dominant community in bhopalgarh . There number vary close to one lakh in the entire constituency .

Demographics
As per 2011 census of India, Bhopalgarh tehsil had a total population of 2,71,567 in 2001 which increased to 3,20,952 in 2011 showing a percentage decadal variation of 18.19%. Bhopalgarh tehsil had an overall sex ratio of 938 in 2011.  In 2011 in Bhopalgarh, 100% of the households were rural. Bhopalgarh tehsil has a  Scheduled caste  population of 69,580 & Scheduled tribe population of 2,876 which account for 21.68% & 0.9% of total population as of 2011. Scheduled caste population percentage (21.68%) over total population of Bhopalgarh tehsil is highest in Jodhpur district.

Bhopalgarh tehsil has a literacy rate of 74.58% for males & 38.97% for females with overall literacy rate being 57.24%. Bhopalgarh tehsil has main workers, marginal workers & total workers percentage of 31.28%, 17.41% & 48.69% respectively over total population of tehsil. It has the highest percentage of female total workers in Jodhpur district with a percentage of 45.91%. Out of the total workers in Bhopalgarh tehsil 56.17% account for agriculture cultivators, 23.44% account for agricultural labourers & 1.68% account for household industry workers &18.71% account for other workers.

Villages
There are thirty-nine panchayat villages in Bhopalgarh tehsil.

Notes
6.http://www.censusindia.gov.in/2011census/dchb/DCHB_A/08/0815_PART_A_DCHB_JODHPUR.pdf

Tehsils of Rajasthan
Jodhpur district